African-American North Carolinians or Black North Carolinians are residents of the state of North Carolina who are of African ancestry. As of the 2010 U.S. Census, African Americans were 22% of the state's population. African slaves were brought to North Carolina during the slave trade.

History 

Slavery has been part of North Carolina's history since its settlement by white Europeans in the late 1600s and early 1700s. Many of the first black slaves in North Carolina were brought to the colony from the West Indies or but a significant number were brought from Africa. Records were not kept of the tribes and homelands of African slaves in North Carolina.

African Americans in North Carolina suffered from racial segregation. Most white people in North Carolina sought to refine the Jim Crow system and retain systematic segregation.

List of historic communities
Western North Carolina:
Rock Hill, Asheville, North Carolina
Petersburg, Asheville, North Carolina
Brooklyn, Asheville, North Carolina
Old Shiloh, Asheville, North Carolina
[New] Shiloh, Asheville, North Carolina

People 

John Chavis
Abraham Galloway
Elizabeth Keckley
George White

DaBaby
J Cole

See also

 African Americans in South Carolina
 African Americans in Tennessee
 African Americans in Georgia (U.S. state)
 Atlantic Creole
 Bristol slave trade
 Coastwise slave trade
 Colonial South and the Chesapeake
 Great Dismal Swamp maroons
 Gullah
 History of slavery in North Carolina
 Scramble (slave auction)
 Seasoning (colonialism)
 Slavery in the colonial history of the United States
 Tobacco colonies
 Demographics of North Carolina
List of African-American historic places in North Carolina
List of African-American newspapers in North Carolina
Black Southerners

External links
 A brief history of slavery in North Carolina
 Slavery
 African Presence in North Carolina
https://docsouth.unc.edu/highlights/roundup.html
A History of African Americans in North Carolina
1898 and White Supremacy
https://uncpress.org/book/9780865263512/history-of-african-americans-in-north-carolina/
https://ncseagrant.ncsu.edu/coastwatch/previous-issues/2015-2/spring-2015/beyond-the-beach-african-american-history-in-coastal-carolina/
https://northcarolinahistory.org/encyclopedia/civil-rights-movement/
https://www.history.com/.amp/topics/us-states/north-carolina

References